Vegetarian Cannibal is a 2012 Croatian drama film directed by Branko Schmidt. It was released on 1 March 2012 and stars Rene Bitorajac as an immoral doctor.

Plot
Danko Babić (Rene Bitorajac) is highly successful and much sought after as a doctor of gynecology, but at the same time he is also incredibly ambitious and willing to do whatever it takes to succeed. These traits eventually lead him to Jedinko (Emir Hadžihafizbegović), a pimp who specializes in high-end prostitution and drug dealing. He's willing to pay Danko a considerable sum to perform abortions on his prostitutes, who get pregnant on a regular basis. Danko quickly gets pulled into a world of organized crime, corruption, and scandal.

Cast

Rene Bitorajac as Danko Babić
Nataša Janjić as Nurse Lana
Leon Lučev as Ilija
Emir Hadžihafizbegović as Jedinko
Zrinka Cvitešić as Dr. Lovrić
Daria Lorenci as Dr. Miller
Ksenija Pajić as Dr. Domljan
Ozren Grabarić as Mario Filipović
Mustafa Nadarević as Pathologist Marelja
Robert Ugrina as Dr. Soldo
Krešimir Mikić as Dr. Bantić
Rakan Rushaidat as Hassan Al Sadat
Ljubomir Kerekeš as Professor Matić
Zdenko Jelčić as Colonel
Slaven Knezović as Smoljo
Ksenija Marinković as Patient Švarc

Production
The film was based on the eponymous novel by Ivo Balenović, also known by the pen name "Alen Bović".

Reception
Film School Rejects was mixed in their review, praising Bitorajac's acting while commenting that the film's ending "will easily divide the audience". The Austinist was more positive, stating "Yes, this movie is kind of a downer, but adventurous filmgoers will probably find Vegetarian Cannibal to be worth their time".

The film was selected as the Croatian entry for the Best Foreign Language Oscar at the 85th Academy Awards, but it did not make the final shortlist.

Lead actor Bitorajac states that he views the character of Danko as the "most despicable character he has ever played" and that while he was initially leery of the script, he was satisfied after seeing the completed product.

Awards
Golden Arena for Best Actor (Rene Bitorajac) at the Pula Film Festival (2012, won) 
Golden Arena for Best Director at the Pula Film Festival (2012, won)
Golden Arena for Best Cinematography at the Pula Film Festival (2012, won)
Best Art Direction at the Pula Film Festival (2012, won)
Best Achievement in Make-Up at the Pula Film Festival (2012, won)
Kodak Award at the Pula Film Festival (2012, won)

See also
 List of submissions to the 85th Academy Awards for Best Foreign Language Film
 List of Croatian submissions for the Academy Award for Best Foreign Language Film

References

External links

2012 films
2012 drama films
Croatian drama films
2010s Croatian-language films
Films directed by Branko Schmidt
Films based on Croatian novels
Films about physicians